Alphonso, King of Naples is a 1690 tragedy by the English writer George Powell.

First staged by the United Company at the Theatre Royal, Drury Lane, the original cast included John Bowman as Alphonso, George Powell as Ferdinand, William Mountfort as  Cesario, John Hodgson as Tachmas, Colley Cibber as Sigismond, John Freeman as Oswell, William Bowen as Fabio and Anne Bracegirdle as Urania.

References

Bibliography
 Van Lennep, W. The London Stage, 1660-1800: Volume One, 1660-1700. Southern Illinois University Press, 1960.

1690 plays
West End plays
Tragedy plays
Plays by George Powell